Our Generation was an anarchist journal published in Montreal, Quebec, Canada from 1961 through 1994.  It was edited, over the entire run, by Dimitrios Roussopoulos.

History and profile
The magazine's original title was Our Generation Against Nuclear War, and its inaugural issue, in 1961, included an introduction by Bertrand Russell, and a mission statement: "devoted to the research, theory, and review of the problems of world peace and directed toward presenting alternative solutions to human conflict". The founders were members of the Montreal branch of the Combined Universities' Campaign of Nuclear Disarmament, established by McGill University students during the late 1950s. By the late 1960s the journal was turning towards anarchist solutions, and by the early 1970s it had become a journal of anarchism and libertarian socialism.

Our Generation ceased publication in 1994, after producing 24 volumes.

See also
List of anarchist periodicals

References

External links
 Publisher's scanned archive of Our Generation (free PDF downloads)

1961 establishments in Ontario
1994 disestablishments in Ontario
Anarchist periodicals
Defunct political magazines published in Canada
Magazines established in 1961
Magazines disestablished in 1994
Magazines published in Montreal